Leren Mae Magnaye Bautista (born January 28, 1993) is a Filipino model, beauty pageant titleholder and politician who was crowned in several major pageants such as  Mutya ng Pilipinas Asia Pacific International 2015 and Binibining Pilipinas Globe 2019. She represented the Philippines at the Miss Tourism Queen of the Year International 2015 where she was crowned as the winner and at The Miss Globe 2019 pageant were she placed as 2nd Runner-Up.

Personal life
Bautista, a Los Baños, Laguna maiden carried the banner for the home squad as she bested 29 other aspirants for the top plum Mutya ng Pilipinas-Asia Pacific International during the coronation ceremonies at Resorts World Manila's Newport Performing Arts Theater in Pasay. Leren has also won local titles prior to Mutya such as Miss Los Baños 2013 and Bb. Laguna 2014. She has two siblings and she is the youngest and the only girl. She finished high school at Trace College and graduated at the Colegio de San Juan de Letran Calamba with a degree in marketing management.

Pageantry

Mutya ng Pilipinas 2015
Bautista competed in Mutya ng Pilipinas 2015 and was crowned as Mutya ng Pilipinas Asia Pacific International 2015. She represented the Philippines at the Miss Tourism Queen of the Year International 2015 pageant in Kuala Lumpur, Malaysia where she won. She brought home special awards such as Best in Swimsuit and Mutya ng Sheridan Resort & Spa.

Miss Tourism Queen of the Year International 2015
Bautista was the representative of the Philippines at the Miss Tourism Queen of the Year International 2015 held in Kuala Lumpur, Malaysia last 31 December 2015 where she bested 56 girls to get the crown.

Binibining Pilipinas 2019
Bautista competed in the Binibining Pilipinas 2019 pageant where she was crowned by her predecessor Michele Gumabao as the Binibining Pilipinas-Globe 2019.

The Miss Globe 2019
Bautista represented the Philippines in The Miss Globe 2019 were she placed as second runner-up.

Miss Universe Philippines 2021
Representing Laguna, Bautista was announced as one of the Top 30 delegates for the Miss Universe Philippines 2021 crown on September 30, 2021 in Bohol, where she placed in the Top 10.

Political career
Bautista filed her candidacy for  member of municipal council of Los Baños in 2022, under Bigkis Pinoy party, wherein she topped the race.

References

External links

1993 births
Living people
Binibining Pilipinas winners
Filipino female models
Miss Universe Philippines contestants
Mutya ng Pilipinas winners
Beauty queen-politicians
21st-century Filipino women politicians
Politicians from Laguna (province)
Filipino city and municipal councilors